(styled as ROHM) is a Japanese electronic parts manufacturer based in Kyoto, Japan. Rohm was incorporated as Toyo Electronics Industry Corporation by Kenichiro Sato (佐藤 研一郎) on September 17, 1958.

The company was originally called R.ohm, which was derived from R for resistors, the original product, plus ohm, the unit of measure for resistance.

The name of the company was officially changed to Rohm in 1979 and then changed again to Rohm Semiconductor in January 2009.

When Rohm was established, resistors were its main product. Later, the company began manufacturing semiconductors. ICs and discrete semiconductors now account for about 80% of Rohm's revenue.

Through 2012, Rohm was among the top 20 semiconductor sales leaders.

International expansion
In 2016, Rohm started the construction of their production facility in Kelantan, Malaysia and commenced the operation on April 2017. A few years later in 2022, Rohm expanded their facility by approximately 1.5 times bigger with the plan to start operating in 2023. The original plant mainly focuses on the production of discrete semiconductors such as diodes while the expanded facility will be focusing on the production of analog LSIs and transistors.

Integrated circuits 

FeRAM and other LSI integrated circuits are designed and  manufactured by the Lapis Semiconductor division of Rohm,
formerly OKI Semiconductor, a division of Oki Electric.

References

External links 
  

Companies listed on the Tokyo Stock Exchange
Companies listed on the Osaka Exchange
Electronics companies of Japan
Equipment semiconductor companies
Manufacturing companies based in Kyoto
Electronics companies established in 1958
1958 establishments in Japan
Japanese brands